Satnam Singh Khattra (23 February 1989 – 29 August 2020) was an Indian fitness trainer and a bodybuilder from Bhalmajra, Fatehgarh Sahib district, Punjab. 

A recovered drug addict, Khattra had a large social media following. He died on 29 August 2020 of a heart attack after a short period of illness.

See Also
 Harminder Dulowal

References

Indian bodybuilders

1989 births
2020 deaths
Sportspeople from Punjab, India
People from Fatehgarh Sahib district